Bahadurpur, Nepal may refer to:
Bahadurpur, Palpa
Bahadurpur, Sarlahi